WERC may refer to:

 WERC (AM), a radio station (960 AM) licensed to Birmingham, Alabama, United States
 WERC-FM, a radio station (105.5 FM) licensed to Hoover, Alabama, United States